May Belfort (c.1872–1929) was an Irish singer, actress and comedian who was famous across Europe and America.

Biography
Born May Egan in Ireland in 1872, she was a comedian and singer on the London music halls and then in Paris where she performed her trademark nonsensical songs at the café des Décadents and the Petit Casino. She commissioned the famous 1895 Henri de Toulouse-Lautrec poster showing her wearing the red dress with her ever present black cat. She became a favourite of the artist who painted her more than once.  She performed in Russia, South Africa and the United States during her career. Belfort was friends with Jane Avril. May Milton was her lover as was Boer General Ben Viljoen. In fact Belfort expected to marry Viljoen. When it turned out he was already married and unwilling to continue the relationship with her, she traveled to Chicago and horsewhipped him in the street. Even after he achieved a divorce, he married another woman. Belfort retired from the stage due to ill health. Due to bad investments in mining, Belfort lost her money and ended working as a rug weaver and living in poverty. She died after a lingering illness in the United States in 1929.

Gallery

References and sources

20th-century Irish women singers
Irish actresses
Irish comedy musicians
1929 deaths
Irish women comedians
1872 births